{{DISPLAYTITLE:C2H4N2O2}}
The molecular formula C2H4N2O2 may refer to:

 1,2-Diformylhydrazine, chemical compound with the formula NH(CHO)
 Oxamide, organic compound with the formula (CONH2)2